Douglas Dean Drabek (born July 25, 1962) is an American former Major League Baseball pitcher and current Pitching Coach for the Reno Aces, the Triple-A affiliate of the Arizona Diamondbacks. He played for the New York Yankees, Pittsburgh Pirates, Houston Astros, Chicago White Sox and Baltimore Orioles between 1986 and 1998. Drabek batted and threw right-handed. Known for his fluid pitching motion and sound mechanics, he won the National League Cy Young Award in 1990.

Early life
Drabek was born in Victoria, Texas. He attended St. Joseph High School in Victoria, where he played football and baseball. Drabek was drafted by the Cleveland Indians in the 4th round of the June 1980 MLB Draft, but did not sign. He then attended the University of Houston and played three seasons for the Cougars baseball team. Following his junior year, Drabek was drafted by the Chicago White Sox in the 11th round of the June 1983 MLB Draft and signed on June 11.

Career
After signing with the White Sox, Drabek was assigned to the Niagara Falls Sox in the short-season New York-Penn League where he finished 6–7 with a 3.67 ERA in 16 games with 103 strikeouts in  innings. After pitching one game for the Class A Appleton, Drabek was promoted to the AA Glens Falls White Sox and was 12–5 with a 2.24 ERA. On 13 August, he was traded to the New York Yankees along with Kevin Hickey to complete an earlier deal made on July 18 for Roy Smalley. Drabek then spent the rest of the 1984 season at AA Nashville. In 1985, Drabek returned to AA and spent the entire season at Albany-Colonie in the Eastern League and finished with a 13–7 record with a 2.99 ERA with 153 strikeouts in  innings. After starting the 1986 season at AAA Columbus, Drabek made his Major League debut on May 30, coming in relief for starter Joe Niekro in a 6–3 loss to the Oakland Athletics. He would spend the rest of the season with the Yankees, appearing in 27 games (21 starts) and go 7–8 with a 4.10 ERA. Following the season, he was traded with Logan Easley and Brian Fisher to the Pittsburgh Pirates for Rick Rhoden, Cecilio Guante and Pat Clements.

Drabek enjoyed his best years with Pittsburgh, from 1987 to 1992, during which time he regularly pitched over 230 innings and consistently finished in the top 10 in the National League ERA race. He went 22–6 with a 2.76 ERA in 1990 en route to winning the National League Cy Young Award and leading the Pirates to the postseason (where they lost in the NLCS to the Cincinnati Reds). His 22 wins that year were a league high; it was also 7 more wins than his previous single-season mark. On August 3, 1990, while with the Pirates, Drabek had a no-hitter broken up by a Sil Campusano single with two out in the ninth. The hit was the only one Drabek would allow in defeating the Philadelphia Phillies 11–0.

Drabek signed as a free agent after the 1992 season with the Houston Astros. Despite a solid 3.79 ERA and playing for a rising team, he posted a 9–18 record and led the National League in losses. He improved in the strike-shortened 1994 season to 12–6 with a 2.84 ERA, and was named an All-Star for the first and only time in his career.

When play resumed after the players' strike in 1995, however, he was unable to maintain his success and retired after the 1998 season, having compiled a 35–40 record over his final four seasons.

Retirement and personal life
After retiring, Drabek coached his son's Little League and select league teams, often teaching them how to bat at a faster pitch, with their personal pitching machine so as to gain an advantage over the other little league teams. Drabek returned to professional baseball in 2010, accepting a position in the Arizona Diamondbacks system as the pitching coach for the Yakima Bears in the short-season Class A Northwest League. On 13 December 2010 the D-backs announced that Drabek was promoted to the pitching coach for the Visalia Rawhide in the Class A California League.

Drabek is married to wife Kristy and has three children; sons Justin (born 1986) and Kyle (born 1987) and daughter Kelsey (born 1991). Justin spent time playing in independent ball. Kyle was a starting pitcher who played for the Arizona Diamondbacks, Chicago White Sox and Toronto Blue Jays.

In February 2018, Drabek was named as the Pitching coach for the AA Jackson Generals. He served as the pitching coach for the Amarillo Sod Poodles in 2019.

See also
 Houston Astros award winners and league leaders

References

External links

Hickok Sports Biography
Baseball Almanac

1962 births
Living people
Baseball coaches from Texas
Baseball players from Houston
Major League Baseball pitchers
Cy Young Award winners
National League All-Stars
National League wins champions
People from Victoria, Texas
New York Yankees players
Pittsburgh Pirates players
Houston Astros players
Chicago White Sox players
Baltimore Orioles players
Houston Cougars baseball players
Niagara Falls Sox players
Appleton Foxes players
Nashville Sounds players
Glens Falls White Sox players
Albany-Colonie Yankees players
Columbus Clippers players
Bowie Baysox players
Hillsboro Hops
American people of Polish descent
People from The Woodlands, Texas
Minor league baseball coaches